Sea Installer is an offshore wind turbine installation jack-up vessel. She was ordered by A2SEA, a Danish offshore wind turbines installation company, and it was built by Chinese COSCO Shipyard Group Co. The contract value is US$139 million.

Her loading capacity is 5000 tons which is equal to eight to ten offshore wind turbines. The crane capacity is 900 tons. The vessel is able to carry up 60 people.

The vessel was delivered in the second half of 2012.

References

External links

 Sea Installer (A2SEA website)

Crane vessels
2012 ships